The 2023 season is São Paulo's 94th season in the club's history and their 63rd in the top-flight of Brazilian football. Along with Série A, São Paulo will be compete in the Campeonato Paulista, Copa do Brasil and Copa Sudamericana.

First-team squad

Youth players with first team numbers

Other players under contract

Out on loan

Retired numbers 
 01 –  Rogério Ceni, Goalkeeper (1990–2015)

Transfers

Transfers in

Loans in

Transfers out

Loans out

Competitions

Overview

Campeonato Paulista

Matches

Quarter-final

Copa Sudamericana

The draw for the group stage will be held on 27 March 2023, 12:00 PYST (UTC−4), at the CONMEBOL Convention Centre in Luque, Paraguay.

Série A

League table

Results summary

Results by round

Matches
The league fixtures were announced on 14 February 2023.

Copa do Brasil

Third round

References

External links

São Paulo FC seasons
São Paulo FC